Mohammad Sadeghi may refer to:

 Mohammad Sadeghi (footballer, born 1952), Iranian footballer
 Mohammad Bagher Sadeghi (born 1989), Iranian football goalkeeper
 Mohammad Sadeghi (actor) (born 1957), Iranian actor